Robert C. Michelson (born 1951) is an American engineer and academic widely known for inventing the entomopter, a biologically inspired flapping-winged aerial robot, and for having established the International Aerial Robotics Competition.  He has received degrees in electrical engineering from the Virginia Polytechnic Institute and the Georgia Institute of Technology. Michelson's professional career began at the U.S. Naval Research Laboratory where he worked on radar-based ocean surveillance systems.  He later became a member of the research faculty at the Georgia Institute of Technology.  At the Georgia Tech Research Institute (GTRI) he was involved in full-time research, directing over 30 major research programs.

He is the author of three U.S. patents and over 100 journal papers, book chapters and reports. Michelson also developed classes in avionics and taught in the School of Aerospace Engineering at the Georgia Institute of Technology until his retirement from the University System of Georgia in 2004.  Michelson is the recipient of the 1998 AUVSI Pioneer Award and the 2001 Pirelli Award for the diffusion of scientific culture as well as the first Top Pirelli Prize.

During the 1990s, he created a tax-exempt corporation to apply high tech solutions to modern archeology and has organized a number of archeological expeditions into eastern Anatolia.  He now heads the engineering consulting company, Millennial Vision, LLC.  Since the mid-1990s, Michelson's work has concentrated on biologically inspired micro air vehicle design.  Michelson is certified in various fields including amateur radio, SCUBA diving, experimental aircraft design/mechanics, and general contracting for home building.

Biography

Early life

Michelson was born in 1951 in Washington D.C., the only son of Carroll and Evelyn Michelson, and is related to Christian Michelsen, the first Prime Minister of Norway. Michelson attended the Burgundy Farm Country Day School during the sixth through eighth grades where he developed an appreciation for botany and ornithology. While at Fort Hunt High School he was President of the Fort Hunt Amateur Rocket Club which built large (2m x 5 cm) instrumented solid fuel rockets that were launched at the Camp Pickett artillery range in Blackstone, Virginia.

Education
Michelson spent sixth through eighth grade at the Burgundy Farm Country Day School and later graduated from Fort Hunt High School in 1969. He graduated from Virginia Polytechnic Institute and State University in 1973 and the Georgia Institute of Technology in 1974 with degrees in Electrical Engineering.

Career
From 1971 to 1973, Michelson was a research engineer working on aerospace radar systems at the U.S. Naval Research Laboratory in Washington D.C. He spent the next 30 years in various engineering and management capacities within the Georgia Tech Research Institute in Atlanta, Georgia. During the 1970s and 1980s Michelson primarily developed radar signal processing and control hardware, but was also interested in the automation of remote sensing systems ranging from the tracking of endangered species to the creation of realistic soldier training scenarios and simulation and testing of foreign military radar assets. In the late 1980s he became Head of the Georgia Tech Research Institute's Technology Development Division and his interests turned to unmanned aerial vehicle systems as a fusion of autonomy, information technology, and aeronautics. In particular, "aerial robotics" (a term he coined in 1990 to represent the infusion of cognition into unmanned aerial vehicles)  dominated his research for the next two decades.

Since the mid-1990s, Michelson's work has concentrated on biologically inspired micro air vehicle design. From 1997 through 2004 Michelson was adjunct associate professor to the School of Aerospace Engineering, teaching classes in avionics for unmanned aerial vehicles (UAVs) and Micro/Mini Air Vehicle (MAV) design. Michelson retired from the Georgia Tech Research Institute in September 2004 and currently holds the title of Principal Research Engineer Emeritus with the Institute. In 2004 he created Millennial Vision, LLC to continue research into biologically inspired aerial robots and remote sensing. He is the President of SEPDAC (Scientific Enterprise in Pursuit and Discovery of Ancient Cultures), a nonprofit educational and scientific organization. He was a member of the board of directors for The Sharp Mountain Preserve for a period of five years (2008-2012).

Professional activities
Michelson has been the U.S. representative and deputy chief referee to the Aviation Industry Corporation of China's UAV Grand Prix during its inaugural year (2011), and again in 2013 and 2015.  He was the section editor for "MAVs and Bio-Inspired UAVs" in Springer's Handbook of Unmanned Aerial Vehicles (released in 2014). Michelson was chosen by the Office of the U.S. Assistant Secretary for the Air Force to represent the United States on the NATO Advisory Group for Aerospace Research and Development (AGARD) to predict future (2020 timeframe) sensor technologies for unmanned aerial systems (UAS) . Michelson was the NATO/RTA (Research and Technology Agency) lecturer at the Turkish Air Force Academy (Hava Harp Okulu) in Istanbul in 2006, and invited lecturer on Micro Air Vehicle technology at both the von Karman Institute for Fluid Dynamics (1999 & 2003) and the Royal Military Academy (2001) in Brussels.  He was the first "MITRE Technology Speaker"(1998) and has been a visiting technology professor in six nations: Australia (2002), Belgium (1999, 2003), Norway (2001), Sweden (2001), Turkey (2001, 2006), and Mexico (2010).

Michelson was a consultant to the U.S. Army and the Indian Ministry of Defence in 2008, responsible for defining and organizing the 1st U.S.-Asian Micro Air Vehicle Demonstration in Agra India. He performed similar duties for the U.S. Army in defining the 1st US-European Micro Air Vehicle Competition/Demonstration in Garmisch Germany in 2005. He created the short course, 21st Century Aerial Robotics, and the digital signal processing lecture/demonstrations in “Principals of Modern Radar” at the Georgia Institute of Technology. He is also creator and organizer of the annual International Aerial Robotics Competition. Before joining the staff of the Georgia Tech Research Institute he participated in design and endo-atmospheric flight testing of computer-controlled space-based radar ocean surveillance systems while employed by the Naval Research Laboratory in Washington, D.C.

Michelson is listed in various editions of Who’s Who in Engineering, Who’s Who in America, and the 23rd edition of Who’s Who in the World. He is the author of over 100 reports, journal papers, and book chapters.

Project director
While at the U.S. Naval Research Laboratory, Michelson worked on radar-based ocean surveillance systems and flew hardware test missions on a Lockheed Warning Star PO-1W Super Constellation. In 1974 Michelson began work at the Georgia Tech Research Institute, where he got his first contract when an entry-level engineer (Research Engineer I).  This first project involved methods to electronically track the endangered species Trichechus manatus (West Indian manatee) in the waters around the Kennedy Space Center.

Michelson directed over 30 major research projects during his career at the Institute. In 1979 Michelson directed the Army's Indirect Fire Simulation effort conducted for Combat Development and Experimentation Command (CDEC). Michelson directed a Defense Advanced Research Projects Agency (DARPA) program to show feasibility of a non-line-of-sight radio-acoustic sensor for bending radar signals using the Bragg principle to detect obstacle-masked targets (essentially making radars look around corners).  He also directed a program to evaluate ground penetration radar for detection of buried natural gas leaks in urban utility systems. During 1981, Michelson directed a program for the automated noninvasive testing of captured foreign threat assets.  This system developed by Michelson's design team remained in use by a foreign power for nearly a decade.  Other radar test devices were also developed by Michelson for U.S. military test and evaluation purposes within the United States, including a program to develop a Ka-band Linear Electronics Countermeasure Source (KABLES) for use in testing U.S. Army millimeter wave assets.

Michelson directed various efforts pertaining to future transportation. His team invented battery-state-of-charge estimation techniques, developed electric vehicle systems simulation tools, and experimented with actively blown surfaces on passenger vehicles. During the mid-1990s, Michelson's research began to focus almost entirely on unmanned vehicle systems, especially those with the power of flight.  He directed efforts with both U.S. Government agencies and private industry pertaining to unmanned aerial vehicles systems (UAS).  One of his first UAS development programs was for a traffic surveillance drone using a compound ducted fan design, made to fly over Atlanta's highways in order to fill surveillance gaps in the State's tower-mounted traffic camera system.  It also could be sent to traffic accident locations to gather and relay vital information in advance of first-responder arrival. Funding shortfalls resulted in the cancellation of the project before its maiden flight, but the design was later marketed for military use.  Michelson's focus turned to smaller vehicle systems that could fly indoors autonomously without the aid of global positioning system (GPS) reference signals.  Under various contracts to DARPA and the Air Force, and using internal research and development funds from the Georgia Tech Research Institute, his design team designed a micro air vehicle (MAV) known as the entomopter.  The NASA Institute for Advanced Concepts recognized the unique flight qualities of the entomopter and awarded Michelson two contracts to explore the feasibility of the entomopter for slow flight in Mars' lower atmosphere.

In 2004 Michelson retired from the Georgia Tech Research Institute and started Millennial Vision, LLC which continued to pursue UAS and MAV research.  Soon after establishing Millennial Vision, LLC, Michelson became engaged in a program to develop an unmanned stratospheric airship for persistent reconnaissance. He maintained interest in MAVs and competitions by helping to define and organize various international events such as the 1st US-European MAV event in Garmisch Germany (MAV-05) and the subsequent 1st US-Asian Demonstration and Assessment of Micro Aerial Vehicle and Unmanned Ground Vehicle Technology (MAV-08) held in Agra India, as adjunct to the U.S. Army RDECOM-Pacific and Indian Ministry of Defence.

Associate professor of Aerospace Engineering
During the 1990s, Michelson became an adjunct associate professor in the Georgia Tech School of Aerospace Engineering, where he taught graduate classes in avionics, with emphasis on unmanned aerial vehicles and micro air vehicles.

In parallel with his teaching duties in the Georgia Tech School of Aerospace Engineering, Michelson created a team-taught short course through the Georgia Tech Department of Continuing Education entitled, "21st Century Aerial Robotics".  Laurence "Nuke" Newcome and Michelson taught this course on the campus of the Georgia Institute of Technology for several years before engaging in single offerings around the United States as well as Sweden, Norway, and Turkey under NATO grants.

Honors and awards
Michelson is an Associate Fellow of the American Institute of Aeronautics and Astronautics (AIAA), Senior Member of the Institute of Electrical and Electronics Engineers (IEEE), and a Full Member of the Scientific Research Society of North America, Sigma Xi.  During the 1990s he served as President and member of the Board of Directors of the Association for Unmanned Vehicle Systems (AUVSI) International organization.  In 1998 Michelson received the AUVSI Pioneer Award  which is the highest level of recognition within the unmanned systems industry for technical contributions.  Michelson is the recipient of the 2001 Pirelli Award for the diffusion of scientific culture,  given by an international jury for the "best multimedia project coming from any educational institution in the world".  For endeavors related to the entomopter, he was also awarded the first €25,000 Top Pirelli Prize.  In 2016, the International Aerial Robotics Competition and its creator, Michelson, were officially recognized during the Georgia legislative session in the form of "Senate Resolution 1255” which recognized his effort in the development of the longest running aerial robotics competition in the world and for having been responsible for moving forward the state of the art in aerial robotics on several occasions during the past quarter century.

Avocations
Michelson has engaged in marine aquarium design and coral propagation since 1997 when he designed and built a fully automated marine reef biome, in which he propagated various coral species that he collected himself.  He has been a NAUI certified SCUBA diver since 1969, and has been a recreational diver in the Caribbean Sea and Pacific Ocean, where he dived on various wrecks and developed methods of collecting and successfully transporting marine invertebrates for propagation. Michelson has also built and flown his own man-rated experimental rotorcraft,  single seat gyrocopter for which Michelson is the FAA certified mechanic and pilot.

While working with ground penetrating radar for detection of urban gas leaks, road voids, and buried land mines at the Georgia Tech Research Institute, Michelson became interested in the use of high technology applications to archeology.  Since 1995 he has organized half a dozen excursions into the military zone along the Turkish-Iranian border, often with Turkish military escort, to research ancient ekistical artifacts of the eastern Anatolia region and has created a 501 (c3) non-profit corporation to apply various non-traditional technologies to the field of archeology.

Michelson completed training in general contracting/home building in 1986 and built his own home.  Later he was overseer for the construction of a Woodstock Georgia church building while continuing his career at the Georgia Tech Research Institute. In 2013 he completed a home of his own design in the mountains of North Georgia that was lumber-free, consisting entirely of steel structural members with concrete foundation and concrete exterior.

Michelson was a Boy Scout and has maintained interest in scouting principles over the years.  As a youth he attained Star rank in Troop 981 located in Alexandria Virginia, and was inducted into the Order of the Arrow. He became a Brotherhood member of Amangamek Wipit Lodge 470, one of the largest lodges in the nation, and participated in activities such as the Philmont Scout Reservation (1967).  Influenced by their father, both of Michelson's sons are Eagle Scouts with gold and silver palm awards.  Michelson was adult advisor to Boy Scouts of America (BSA) Troop/Crew 8880 until its transition away from the BSA to becoming a Trail Life USA unit where Michelson remains in an advisory capacity.

Michelson has had interest in languages and syntax both for computers and spoken communication.  He was formally taught Fortran in undergraduate school and learned BASIC, Forth, and various assembly languages on his own in support of his computer-based projects.  He designed the target processing unit for the Army's Environment and Radar Operation Simulator (EROS) where it was necessary to design the hardware and coding language for a 10 MHz (100 ns cycle time) processor before such things were available in microprocessor form.

 As to spoken languages, he is fluent in English, and is proficient in both Spanish and Turkish.

Presence in popular media and literature

Michelson has been widely interviewed and quoted in print (e.g., Business Week, Popular Mechanics, Scientific American, Chronicle of Higher Education), radio (e.g., National Public Radio, Armed Forces Radio, American Association for the Advancement of Science radio syndicate), and on television (e.g., Scientific American Frontiers, Discovery Channel, CNN, BBC, and various ABC/CBS/NBC/Fox affiliates). Worldwide interest in robotics, and especially the robots of war, spawned a series of televised robotics programming about Michelson's work. A technical biography of Robert Michelson is the subject of episode 1008 of the television program Beyond Invention, which chronicles a number of his research projects including UAV research, the International Aerial Robotics Competition, the entomopter-based Mars surveyor, and his work with automated coral propagation. Michelson is featured in various television programs focused specifically on the International Aerial Robotics Competition, including an hour-long Discovery Science Channel program entitled Airbots.

Michelson has been often quoted in news programming with regard to the International Aerial Robotics Competition and the applications of the underlying technology to military and civilian spheres. As the use of robotic drone aircraft increased during the Gulf Wars, public interest in the subject was peaked and Michelson began to be featured in series and specials such as the NOVA episode "Spies that Fly" and the BBC special Seven Ways to Topple Saddam. Because of the notoriety of his aerial robotic research, Michelson even became the basis for the fictional character Michael C. Robertson in the novel Drone Games (2014) by Joel Narlock. In this work, Michael C. Robertson is the creator of the entomopter at the Georgia Technology Research Institute. This fictitious character's name is an anagram of Robert C. Michelson, the actual inventor of the entomopter at the Georgia Tech Research Institute. Michelson's entomopter is also featured in another of Joel Narlock's novels, Target Acquired (2003).

Patents
“US patent 6,082,671”, Robert C. Michelson, "Entomopter and Method for Using Same", issued 2000-07-04
“US patent 6,094,033”, Robert C. Michelson, "Battery State of Charge Detector with Rapid Charging Capability and Method", issued 2000-07-25
“US patent 6,446,909”, Robert C. Michelson, "Reciprocating Chemical Muscle (RCM) and Method for Using Same", issued 2002-09-10

Representative publications
“Test and Evaluation for Fully Autonomous Micro Air Vehicles,” The ITEA Journal, December 2008, Volume 29, Number 4, ISSN 1054-0229 International Test and Evaluation Association, pp. 367–374 (winner of the 2009 International Test and Evaluation Association Publication Award)
“Very small flying machines,” 2006 Yearbook of Science & Technology, McGraw-Hill, New York, 2006, pp. 341–344
“Novel Approaches to Miniature Flight Platforms,” Proceedings of the Institute of Mechanical Engineers, Vol. 218 Part G: Journal of Aerospace Engineering, Special Issue Paper 2004, pp. 363–373
“Beyond Biologically Inspired Insect Flight,” von Karman Institute for Fluid Dynamics RTO/AVT Lecture Series on Low Reynolds Number Aerodynamics on Aircraft Including Applications in Emerging UAV Technology, Brussels Belgium, 24–28 November 2003
“The Entomopter,” Neurotechnology for Biomimetic Robots, The MIT Press, September 2002, pp. 481–509
“Autonomous Vehicles,” Proceedings of the IEEE, Vol. 84, No. 8, August 1996, pp. 1147–1164
“Feasibility of Applying Radio-Acoustic Techniques to Non Line-of-Sight Sensing,” AIAA Journal of Aircraft, Vol. 33, No. 2, March – April 1996, pp. 260–267
“Tracking of the Florida Manatee,” ISA Transactions, Vol. 21, No. 1, 1982, pp. 79–85

See also
Entomopter
International Aerial Robotics Competition
Micro air vehicle

References

External links

Curriculum Vitae of Robert C. Michelson

1951 births
Living people
20th-century American inventors
21st-century American inventors
21st-century American engineers
American patent holders
American people of Norwegian descent
American roboticists
Engineering educators
Georgia Tech faculty
Georgia Tech alumni
Georgia Tech Research Institute people
Virginia Tech alumni
People associated with radar
Senior Members of the IEEE
Amateur radio people
People from Atlanta